Jacinth Ambrosia Airport  serves Jacinth Ambrosia Mine  northwest of Ceduna, South Australia.

Airlines and destinations

See also
 List of airports in South Australia
Yellabinna, South Australia

References

Airports in South Australia